Royal Court in Sutjeska was a medieval Bosnian court, residence and administrative seat of the Bosnian king, from mid-fourteenth to mid-fifteenth century, located in present-day Kraljeva Sutjeska, Bosnia and Herzegovina.

In its close proximity is the location of medieval royal castle of Bobovac, the crown jewels of Bosnia were held. The royal chapel in Bobovac consisted the burial chamber of several Bosnian kings and queens. Nine skeletons have been found in the five tombs located in the mausoleum. The identified skeletons belong to kings Dabiša, Ostoja, Ostojić, Tvrtko II and Thomas. It is assumed that one of the remaining skeletons belongs to the last king, Tomašević, decapitated in Jajce on the order of Mehmed the Conqueror. Only one of the skeletons, found next to that of King Tvrtko II, is female and assumed to belong to Tvrtko II's wife, Queen Dorothy.

The court in Trstionica (present-day Kraljeva Sutjeska) was established by Ban of Bosnia, Stjepan II Kotromanić. The compound consisted of several buildings, chapel, and the nucleus of what will later become Kraljeva Sutjeska Franciscan Monastery.

See also

Bobovac
List of National Monuments of Bosnia and Herzegovina

References

External links
The Royal Court in Kraljeva Sutjeska, photos at alltravels.com

 

Kingdom of Bosnia
Medieval Bosnian state
National Monuments of Bosnia and Herzegovina
Banate of Bosnia
Medieval sites in Bosnia and Herzegovina